At least two warships of Japan have been named Akigumo:

, a  launched in 1941 and sunk in 1944
, a  launched in 1973 and struck in 2005

Japanese Navy ship names